Ernest Jerome Weiss (9 October 1926 – 5 November 1985) was a Canadian sailor who competed in the 1968 Summer Olympics. He was born in Toronto.

References

1926 births
1985 deaths
Sportspeople from Toronto
Canadian male sailors (sport)
Olympic sailors of Canada
Sailors at the 1968 Summer Olympics – 5.5 Metre